Two Doors Down or variation, may refer to:

Music
 "Two Doors Down" (Dolly Parton song), a 1977 song by 'Dolly Parton' off the album Here You Come Again
 "Two Doors Down" (Mystery Jets song), a 2008 song by 'Mystery Jets' off the album Twenty One
 "Two Doors Down", a 2016 song by 'Dwight Yoakam' off the album Swimmin' Pools, Movie Stars...

Television
 Two Doors Down (TV series), a BBC Scotland TV sitcom
 "Two Doors Down" (TV episode), a 2019 episode of Dolly Parton's Heartstrings
 "Two Doors Down" (TV episode), a 2016 episode of Cops; see List of Cops episodes (season 21–present)

Other uses
 Two Doors Down, a UK radio programme; see List of UK radio programmes

See also

 3 Doors Down (disambiguation)
 Next Door (disambiguation)